Kiama is an electoral district of the Legislative Assembly in the Australian state of New South Wales. It is currently represented by Gareth Ward. Originally elected as a member of the Liberal Party, Ward stood down from the party in May 2021 following allegations of sexual misconduct. 

The electorate is named after and includes the Municipality of Kiama. It also includes the southern part of the City of Shellharbour (including the suburbs of Albion Park and the western part of Albion Park Rail) and the part of the City of Shoalhaven to the north of the Shoalhaven river (including Bomaderry and Berry). It includes a thinly populated area to the west of Nowra south of the Shoalhaven. It also includes Marshall Mount in the City of Wollongong.

History

Kiama was created in 1859. It was abolished in 1904 with the downsizing of parliament after federation and replaced by Allowrie. It was recreated in 1981, replacing parts of Illawarra and South Coast.

Members for Kiama

Election results

References

External links

Kiama
1859 establishments in Australia
Kiama
1904 disestablishments in Australia
Kiama
1981 establishments in Australia
Kiama